Delta Scuti, Latinized from δ Scuti, is a variable star in the southern constellation Scutum. With an apparent visual magnitude that fluctuates around 4.72, it is the fifth-brightest star in this small and otherwise undistinguished constellation. It is drifting closer with a radial velocity of −45 km/s.

In 1900, William W. Campbell and William H. Wright used the Mills spectrograph at the Lick Observatory to determine that this star has a variable radial velocity. The  period of this variability as well as 0.2 magnitude changes in luminosity demonstrated in 1935 that the variability was intrinsic, rather than being the result of a spectroscopic binary. In 1938, a secondary period was discovered and a pulsation theory was proposed to model the variation. Since then, observation of Delta Scuti has shown that it pulsates in multiple discrete radial and non-radial modes. The strongest mode has a frequency of 59.731 μHz, the next strongest has a frequency of 61.936 μHz, and so forth, with a total of eight different frequency modes now modeled.

Delta Scuti is the prototype of the Delta Scuti type variable stars. It is a high-amplitude δ Scuti type pulsator with light variations of about 0.19 magnitudes (V). The peculiar chemical abundances of this star are similar to those of Am stars. It has a stellar classification of F2 IIIp, matching an F-type giant star. Delta Scuti has 2.2 times the mass and 4.8 times the radius of the Sun. It is approximately 700 million years old and is spinning with a projected rotational velocity of 25.5 km/s. On average, the star is radiating 40 times the luminosity of the Sun from its photosphere at an effective temperature of 6,638 K.

The space velocity components of this star in the galactic coordinate system are  = . It will reach an apparent magnitude of −1.84, brighter than the current −1.46 of Sirius.

This star has two optical companions. The first is a +12.2 magnitude star that is 15.2 arcseconds from Delta Scuti. The second is a +9.2 magnitude star that is 53 arcseconds away.  Both are distant background stars unrelated to Delta Scuti.

Flamsteed did not recognise the constellation Scutum and included several of its stars in Aquila.  δ Scuti was catalogued as 2 Aquilae.  The Bayer designation δ was assigned by Gould rather than Bayer.

References

External links
 AAVSO Variable Star of the Month: Delta Scuti and the Delta Scuti Variables

F-type giants
Delta Scuti variables

Scutum (constellation)
Scuti, Delta
Durchmusterung objects
Scuti, 2
172748
091726
7020
TIC objects

pt:Delta Scuti